Tokarnia may refer to the following places in Poland:

Tokarnia, Lesser Poland Voivodeship (south Poland)
Tokarnia, Sanok County in Subcarpathian Voivodeship (south-east Poland)
Tokarnia, Świętokrzyskie Voivodeship (south-central Poland)
Tokarnia (mountain), in the Bukowica Range (south-east Poland)